Kinnersley railway station was a station in Kinnersley, Herefordshire, England. The station was opened in 1863 and closed in 1962.  The station was located south of the village, next to the present day Kinnersley Arms public house.

References

Further reading

Disused railway stations in Herefordshire
Railway stations in Great Britain opened in 1863
Railway stations in Great Britain closed in 1962
Former Midland Railway stations